The Carlton Gardens is a World Heritage Site located on the northeastern edge of the Central Business District in the suburb of Carlton, in Melbourne, Australia. A popular picnic and barbecue area, the heritage-listed Carlton Gardens are home to an array of wildlife, including brushtail possums.

The  site contains the Royal Exhibition Building, Melbourne Museum and Imax Cinema, tennis courts and an award-winning children's playground. The rectangular site is bound by Victoria Street, Rathdowne Street, Carlton Street, and Nicholson Street. From the Exhibition building the gardens gently slope down to the southwest and northeast. According to the World Heritage listing the Royal Exhibition Buildings and Carlton Gardens are "of historical, architectural, aesthetic, social and scientific (botanical) significance to the State of Victoria."

The gardens are an example of Victorian landscape design with sweeping lawns and varied European and Australian tree plantings consisting of deciduous English oaks, White Poplar, plane trees, elms, conifers, cedars, turkey oaks, Araucarias and evergreens such as Moreton Bay figs, combined with flower beds of annuals and shrubs. A network of tree-lined paths provides formal avenues for highlighting the fountains and architecture of the Exhibition building. This includes the grand allee of plane trees that lead to the exhibition building. Two small ornamental lakes adorn the southern section of the park. The northern section contains the museum, tennis courts, maintenance depot and curator's cottage, and the children's playground designed as a Victorian maze. Dramatic tree-lined avenues, a majestic fountain, formal flowerbeds and miniature lakes are features of these late nineteenth century Gardens.

The listing in the Victorian Heritage Register says in part: 
"The Carlton Gardens are of scientific (botanical) significance for their outstanding collection of plants, including conifers, palms, evergreen and deciduous trees, many of which have grown to an outstanding size and form. The elm avenues of Ulmus procera and Ulmus × hollandica are significant as few examples remain world wide due to Dutch elm disease. The Garden contains a rare specimen of Acmena ingens, only five other specimens are known, an uncommon Harpephyllum caffrum and the largest recorded in Victoria, Taxodium distichum, and outstanding specimens of Chamaecyparis funebris and Ficus macrophylla, south west of the Royal Exhibition Building."

Wildlife includes brushtailed possums, ducks and ducklings in spring, tawny frogmouths, kookaburras. Indian mynas and silver gulls are common. At night Gould's wattled bat and white-striped freetail bats hunt for insects while grey-headed flying foxes visit the gardens when native trees are flowering or fruiting.

The gardens contain three important fountains: the Exhibition Fountain, designed for the 1880 Exhibition by sculptor Joseph Hochgurtel; the French Fountain; and the Westgarth Drinking Fountain.

The grounds adjoining the north of the Exhibition Building formerly contained a sports ground, known as the Exhibition Oval or Exhibition Track. A fifth-of-a-mile oval asphalt cycling track was built in 1890, then was refurbished in 1896 to improve the surface and widen and bank the corners. The circuit held cycling races until the 1920s, as well as low-powered motorcycle races. The cycling track was removed in 1928, and replaced with a dirt track for high-powered motorcycle racing, which was growing in popularity at the time. A new seventh-of-a-mile banked oval board track was constructed in its place in 1936, but was removed in 1939 after the Supreme Court ruled that the track contravened the Exhibition Act, which required that the public have free access to the grounds; the track itself was moved to Napier Park, Essendon. Throughout its existence, the grassed oval in the middle of the racing tracks was used for various field sports events and carnivals, and at one point during a 1931 dispute between the Victorian Football League and its Grounds Management Association, the oval was on stand-by to serve as a VFL venue during the 1931 season. The gardens including the Exhibition Building and the fountains are now a popular spot for wedding photography.

History

 1839 – Large tracts of land surrounding the original town grid of Melbourne were reserved from sale by Superintendent Charles La Trobe. Most of this land was later sold and subdivided or used for the development of various public institutions, but a number of substantial sites were permanently reserved as public parks, including the Carlton Gardens as well as Flagstaff Gardens, Fitzroy Gardens, Treasury Gardens and Kings Domain.
 Circa 1856 – The City of Melbourne obtained control of the Carlton Gardens, and engaged Edward La Trobe Bateman to prepare a design for the site. The path layout and other features of the design were built although limitations on funding for maintenance etc. resulted in frequent criticism.
 1870s – The colonial Victorian Government resumed control of the Gardens and minor changes and were made under the direction of Clement Hodgkinson. The site was soon afterwards drastically redesigned for the 1880 Melbourne International Exhibition by the architect Joseph Reed. The prominent local horticulturist and landscape designer William Sangster was engaged as a contractor to redevelop the gardens in February 1879. 
 1880 – Exhibition Building completed for the Melbourne International Exhibition that year. Temporary annexes to house some of the exhibition in the northern section were demolished after the exhibition closed on 30 April 1881.
 1888 – Melbourne Centennial Exhibition to celebrate a century of European settlement in Australia.
 1891 – The curator's Lodge was completed and lived in by John Guilfoyle.
 1901 – First Parliament of Australia opens in the Exhibition Building. The west annex of the Building becomes the site of the Victorian Parliament for the next 27 years.
 1919 – buildings became an emergency hospital for influenza epidemic victims
 1928 – Perimeter fence removed leaving the bluestone footings.
 Second World War: the buildings were used by the Royal Australian Air Force.
 1948 to 1961 – part of the complex was used as a migrant reception centre.
 1999 – Melbourne Museum opens, taking up one sixth of the site.
 2001 –  Taylor Cullity Lethlean with Mary Jeavons wins a landscape award for design and building a new children's playground of elegant yet robust resolution. The Jury described the design as a distinctive and unified design that respects its historic setting and addresses the demands of creative play for spatial and visual variety.
 July 2004 – After several years of lobbying by the Melbourne City Council, The Royal Exhibition Building and Carlton Gardens, Melbourne, were inscribed on the World Heritage List at the 28th session of the World Heritage Committee held in Suzhou, China.

The Exhibition Building is still used for exhibitions, including for the annual Melbourne International Flower and Garden Show. The Melbourne Convention & Exhibition Centre, opened in 1996 at Southbank, provides more modern facilities and has become Melbourne's prime location for exhibitions and conventions.

Gallery

References

External links

 World heritage listing for Carlton Gardens
 Melbourne City Council – Carlton Gardens
 Open Space and Recreation – Merit Carlton Gardens Playground
 World Heritage, World Futures — Restoration of the Western Forecourt of the Royal Exhibition Building, Melbourne

Heritage sites in Melbourne
Parks in Melbourne
World Heritage Sites in Victoria (Australia)
Gardens in Victoria (Australia)
World's fair sites in Australia
Defunct speedway venues in Australia
City of Melbourne